The Queensland Railways A10 Ipswich class locomotive was a one-off  steam locomotive operated by the Queensland Railways.

History
In 1877, the North Ipswich Railway Workshops built a one-off  steam locomotive entering service on the Southern & Western Railway numbered 36. In 1880 it was sent to the then isolated Bundaberg line and renumbered 3. In 1890, as part of the Queensland Railways renumbering scheme, it was renumbered 132. It was sold to McArdle & Thompson in February 1881, being resold to Fairymead Sugar Mill in 1892.

References

External links

Railway locomotives introduced in 1877
A10 Ipswich
2-4-0 locomotives
3 ft 6 in gauge locomotives of Australia